Lou Takes Off is an album by jazz saxophonist Lou Donaldson recorded for the Blue Note label and performed by a sextet also featuring trumpeter Donald Byrd, trombonist  Curtis Fuller, pianist Sonny Clark, bassist Jamil Nasser and drummer Art Taylor. The album was awarded 4½ stars by Lee Bloom in an Allmusic review which stated "This recording marks a period in his development prior to a stylistic shift away from bop and toward a stronger rhythm and blues emphasis... Overall, Lou Takes Off breaks no new musical ground, but it is a solid, swinging session of high-caliber playing. According to Donaldson, Blue Note initially didn't like any of the album, "the conga drums or the new musicians."

Track listing
All compositions by Lou Donaldson except as indicated

 "Sputnik" - 10:05
 "Dewey Square" (Charlie Parker) - 7:16 	
 "Strollin' In" - 14:34 	
 "Groovin' High" (Dizzy Gillespie) - 6:22

Personnel
Lou Donaldson - alto saxophone
Donald Byrd - trumpet
Curtis Fuller - trombone
Sonny Clark - piano
Jamil Nasser - bass
Art Taylor - drums

Production
 Alfred Lion - producer
 Reid Miles - design
 Rudy Van Gelder - engineer
 Francis Wolff - photography

References

Lou Donaldson albums
1958 albums
Blue Note Records albums
Albums produced by Alfred Lion
Albums recorded at Van Gelder Studio